"She's Just Killing Me" is a song by rock band ZZ Top, released as the first single from their 1996 album, Rhythmeen. The song is featured in the film From Dusk till Dawn and on its soundtrack, which also includes "Mexican Blackbird" from the 1975 album Fandango!.

Track listing
"She's Just Killing Me"
"Dengue Woman" by Jimmie Vaughan

Music video
The music video shows ZZ Top playing in a bar then cuts to video clips from the film From Dusk till Dawn featuring George Clooney and Salma Hayek.

Personnel
Billy Gibbons - guitar, lead vocals
Dusty Hill - bass, backing vocals
Frank Beard - drums

1996 singles
1996 songs
ZZ Top songs
From Dusk till Dawn (franchise)
Songs written for films
Songs written by Billy Gibbons
Songs written by Dusty Hill
Songs written by Frank Beard (musician)
RCA Records singles
Song recordings produced by Bill Ham